Pedro Pablo Morales Jr. (born December 5, 1964) is an American former competitive swimmer. He set world records in the 100-meter butterfly in 1984 and 1986. He was the 100-meter butterfly gold medalist at the 1992 Olympic Games, as well as winning 4 × 100 meter medley relay gold medals at both the 1984 and 1992 Olympic Games. He also won 100-meter butterfly and 4 × 100 meter medley relay gold medals at the 1986 World Championships.

Biography
Morales attended Bellarmine College Preparatory, in San Jose, California, and trained under the supervision of Larry Rogers. 

Morales won a relay gold and two silver medals swimming butterfly at the 1984 Olympics in Los Angeles and set the world record in the 100-meter butterfly at the US Olympic Trials that year with a time of 53.38 seconds, as well as setting relay records with teammates Rick Carey, Steve Lundquist and Rowdy Gaines. After losing the 100-meter butterfly world record to German swimmer Michael Gross in 1984, he regained it in 1986 with a swim of 52.84 seconds. This record stood until 1995. 

In 1988, on the heels of a record 11th National Collegiate Athletic Association (NCAA) individual championship at Stanford University, Morales surprisingly failed to qualify for the 1988 Olympics. 

After briefly retiring from the sport to pursue a JD degree at Cornell Law School in Ithaca, New York, Morales returned to swimming and qualified for the 1992 Olympics in Barcelona, where he was the US team captain and captured gold in the 100-meter butterfly.

Coaching career
Morales is currently the head women's swimming and diving coach at the University of Nebraska-Lincoln.

See also
 List of members of the International Swimming Hall of Fame
 List of multiple Olympic gold medalists
 List of notable Cuban-Americans
 List of Olympic medalists in swimming (men)
 List of Stanford University people
 List of World Aquatics Championships medalists in swimming (men)
 World record progression 100 metres butterfly
 World record progression 4 × 100 metres medley relay

External links
 
 

1964 births
Living people
American people of Mexican descent
American male butterfly swimmers
American male freestyle swimmers
American male medley swimmers
American swimming coaches
College swimming coaches in the United States
Cornell Law School alumni
World record setters in swimming
Nebraska Cornhuskers swimming coaches
Olympic gold medalists for the United States in swimming
Olympic silver medalists for the United States in swimming
Swimmers from Chicago
Sportspeople from Chicago
Stanford Cardinal men's swimmers
Swimmers at the 1983 Pan American Games
Swimmers at the 1984 Summer Olympics
Swimmers at the 1992 Summer Olympics
Swimmers from San Jose, California
World Aquatics Championships medalists in swimming
Medalists at the 1992 Summer Olympics
Medalists at the 1984 Summer Olympics
Pan American Games silver medalists for the United States
Pan American Games medalists in swimming
Medalists at the 1983 Pan American Games
20th-century American people
21st-century American people